Format of entries is:
 ICAO (IATA) – Airport Name – Airport Location

PA PF PO PP – Alaska

PA 
 PAAK (AKB) – Atka Airport (FAA: AKA) – Atka, Alaska
 PAAL (PML) – Port Moller Airport (FAA: 1AK3) – Cold Bay, Alaska
 PAAM – Driftwood Bay Air Force Station Airfield (FAA: AK23) – Dutch Harbor, Alaska
 PAAN – Gold King Creek Airport (FAA: AK7) – Fairbanks, Alaska
 PAAP (PTD) – Port Alexander Seaplane Base (FAA: AHP) – Port Alexander, Alaska
 PAAQ (PAQ) – Palmer Municipal Airport – Palmer, Alaska
 PAAT (ATU) – Casco Cove Coast Guard Station – Attu Island, Alaska http://www.airport-data.com/world-airports/icao-code/P.html
 PABA (BTI) – Barter Island LRRS Airport (Kaktovik Airport) – Barter Island, Alaska
 PABE (BET) – Bethel Airport – Bethel, Alaska
 PABG (BVU) – Beluga Airport (FAA: BLG) – Beluga, Alaska
 PABI (BIG) – Allen Army Airfield (formerly Big Delta Army Airfield) – Fort Greely / Delta Junction, Alaska
 PABL (BKC) – Buckland Airport (FAA: BVK) – Buckland, Alaska
 PABM (BMX) – Big Mountain Air Force Station (FAA: 37AK) – Big Mountain, Alaska
 PABN – Devils Mountain Lodge Airport (FAA: IBN) – Nabesna, Alaska
 PABR (BRW) – Wiley Post–Will Rogers Memorial Airport – Barrow, Alaska
 PABT (BTT) – Bettles Airport – Bettles, Alaska
 PABU (BTI) – Bullen Point Air Force Station (possibly defunct) (FAA: 8AK7) – Kaktovik, Alaska
 PABV – Birchwood Airport (FAA: BCV) – Birchwood, Alaska
 PACA (CSP) – Cape Spencer Coast Guard Heliport – Cape Spencer, Alaska
 PACD (CDB) – Cold Bay Airport – Cold Bay, Alaska
 PACE (CEM) – Central Airport – Central, Alaska
 PACH (CHU) – Chuathbaluk Airport (FAA: 9A3) – Chuathbaluk, Alaska
 PACI (CIK) – Chalkyitsik Airport – Chalkyitsik, Alaska
 PACJ (CKD) – Crooked Creek Airport – Crooked Creek, Alaska
 PACK (CYF) – Chefornak Airport (FAA: CFK) – Chefornak, Alaska
 PACL – Clear Airport / Clear Space Force Station (FAA: Z84) – Clear, Alaska
 PACM (SCM) – Scammon Bay Airport – Scammon Bay, Alaska
 PACR (IRC) – Circle City Airport (FAA: CRC) – Circle, Alaska
 PACS – Cape Sarichef Airport (FAA: 26AK) – Unimak Island
 PACV (CDV) – Merle K. (Mudhole) Smith Airport – Cordova, Alaska
 PACX (CXF) – Coldfoot Airport – Coldfoot, Alaska
 PACZ (CZF) – Cape Romanzof LRRS Airport – Cape Romanzof, Alaska
 PADE (DRG) – Deering Airport (FAA: DEE) – Deering, Alaska
 PADG (RDB) – Red Dog Airport (FAA: DGG) – Red Dog Mine, Alaska
 PADK (ADK) – Adak Airport (Mitchell Field) – Adak Island, Alaska
 PADL (DLG) – Dillingham Airport – Dillingham, Alaska
 PADM (MLL) – Marshall Don Hunter Sr. Airport (FAA: MDM) – Marshall, Alaska
 PADQ (ADQ) – Kodiak Airport (Benny Benson State Airport) – Kodiak, Alaska
 PADT – Duffy's Tavern Airport (FAA: DDT) – Slana, Alaska
 PADU (DUT) – Unalaska Airport (Tom Madsen/Dutch Harbor Airport) – Unalaska, Alaska
 PADY (KKH) – Kongiganak Airport (FAA: DUY) – Kongiganak, Alaska
 PAED (EDF) – Elmendorf Air Force Base – Anchorage, Alaska
 PAEE (EEK) – Eek Airport – Eek, Alaska
 PAEG (EAA) – Eagle Airport – Eagle, Alaska
 PAEH (EHM) – Cape Newenham LRRS Airport – Cape Newenham, Alaska
 PAEI (EIL) – Eielson Air Force Base – Fairbanks, Alaska
 PAEL (ELV) – Elfin Cove Seaplane Base – Elfin Cove, Alaska
 PAEM (EMK) – Emmonak Airport (FAA: ENM) – Emmonak, Alaska
 PAEN (ENA) – Kenai Municipal Airport – Kenai, Alaska
 PAEW (WWT) – Newtok Airport (FAA: EWU) – Newtok, Alaska
 PAFA (FAI) – Fairbanks International Airport – Fairbanks, Alaska
 PAFB (FBK) – Ladd Army Airfield (Fort Wainwright AAF) – Fairbanks, Alaska / Fort Wainwright
 PAFE (KAE) – Kake Airport (FAA: AFE) – Kake, Alaska
 PAFK – Farewell Lake Seaplane Base (FAA: FKK) – Farewell Lake, Alaska
 PAFL – Tin Creek Airport (FAA: TNW) – Farewell Lake, Alaska
 PAFM (ABL) – Ambler Airport (FAA: AFM) – Ambler, Alaska
 PAFR (FRN) – Bryant Army Airport – Fort Richardson
 PAFS (NIB) – Nikolai Airport (FAA: FSP) – Nikolai, Alaska
 PAFV (FMC) – Five Mile Airport (FAA: FVM) – Five Mile, Alaska
 PAGA (GAL) – Edward G. Pitka Sr. Airport – Galena, Alaska
 PAGB (GBH) – Galbraith Lake Airport – Galbraith Lake, Alaska
 PAGG – Kwigillingok Airport (FAA: GGV) – Kwigillingok, Alaska
 PAGH (SHG) – Shungnak Airport – Shungnak, Alaska
 PAGK (GKN) – Gulkana Airport – Gulkana, Alaska
 PAGL (GLV) – Golovin Airport (FAA: N93) – Golovin, Alaska
 PAGM (GAM) – Gambell Airport – Gambell, Alaska
 PAGN (AGN) – Angoon Seaplane Base – Angoon, Alaska
 PAGQ (BGQ) – Big Lake Airport – Big Lake, Alaska
 PAGS (GST) – Gustavus Airport – Gustavus, Alaska
 PAGT (NME) – Nightmute Airport (FAA: IGT) – Nightmute, Alaska
 PAGX (KGX) – Grayling Airport – Grayling, Alaska
 PAGY (SGY) – Skagway Airport – Skagway, Alaska
 PAHC (HCR) – Holy Cross Airport (FAA: HCA) – Holy Cross, Alaska
 PAHL (HSL) – Huslia Airport (FAA: HLA) – Huslia, Alaska
 PAHN (HNS) – Haines Airport – Haines, Alaska
 PAHO (HOM) – Homer Airport – Homer, Alaska
 PAHP (HPB) – Hooper Bay Airport – Hooper Bay, Alaska
 PAHU (HUS) – Hughes Airport – Hughes, Alaska
 PAHV – Healy River Airport (FAA: HRR) – Healy, Alaska
 PAHX (SHX) – Shageluk Airport – Shageluk, Alaska
 PAHY (HYG) – Hydaburg Seaplane Base – Hydaburg, Alaska
 PAIG (IGG) – Igiugig Airport – Igiugig, Alaska
 PAII (EGX) – Egegik Airport (FAA: EII) – Egegik, Alaska
 PAIK (IAN) – Bob Baker Memorial Airport – Kiana, Alaska
 PAIL (ILI) – Iliamna Airport – Iliamna, Alaska
 PAIM (UTO) – Indian Mountain LRRS Airport – Indian Mountain Air Force Station
 PAIN (MCL) – McKinley National Park Airport (FAA: INR) – McKinley Park, Alaska
 PAIW (WAA) – Wales Airport (FAA: IWK) – Wales, Alaska
 PAJC – Chignik Airport (FAA: AJC) – Chignik, Alaska
 PAJN (JNU) – Juneau International Airport – Juneau, Alaska
 PAJO – Johnstone Point Airport (FAA: 2AK5) – Hinchinbrook Island, Alaska
 PAJV – Jonesville Mine Airport (FAA: JVM) (possibly defunct) – Sutton, Alaska
 PAJZ (KGK) – Koliganek Airport (FAA: JZZ) – Koliganek, Alaska
 PAKA (TEK) – Tatitlek Airport – Tatitlek, Alaska
 PAKD (KDK) – Kodiak Municipal Airport – Kodiak, Alaska
 PAKF (KFP) – False Pass Airport – False Pass, Alaska
 PAKH (AKK) – Akhiok Airport – Akhiok, Alaska
 PAKI (KPN) – Kipnuk Airport (FAA: IIK) – Kipnuk, Alaska
 PAKK (KKA) – Koyuk Alfred Adams Airport – Koyuk, Alaska
 PAKL (LKK) – Kulik Lake Airport – Kulik Lake, Alaska
 PAKN (AKN) – King Salmon Airport – King Salmon, Alaska
 PAKO (IKO) – Nikolski Air Station – Nikolski, Alaska
 PAKP (AKP) – Anaktuvuk Pass Airport – Anaktuvuk Pass, Alaska
 PAKT (KTN) – Ketchikan International Airport – Ketchikan, Alaska
 PAKU (UUK) – Ugnu-Kuparuk Airport (FAA: UBW) – Kuparuk, Alaska
 PAKV (KAL) – Kaltag Airport – Kaltag, Alaska
 PAKW (KLW) – Klawock Airport (FAA: AKW) – Klawock, Alaska
 PAKY (KYK) – Karluk Airport – Karluk, Alaska
 PALB (KLN) – Larsen Bay Airport (FAA: 2A3) – Larsen Bay, Alaska
 PALG (KLG) – Kalskag Airport – between the cities of Upper Kalskag and Lower Kalskag
 PALH – Lake Hood Seaplane Base (FAA: LHD) – Anchorage, Alaska
 PALJ (PTA) – Port Alsworth Airport (FAA: TPO) – Port Alsworth, Alaska
 PALN (LNI) – Point Lonely Short Range Radar Site (FAA: AK71) – Point Lonely, Alaska
 PALP – Alpine Airstrip (FAA: AK15) – Deadhorse, Alaska
 PALR (WCR) – Chandalar Lake Airport – Chandalar Lake, Alaska
 PALU (LUR) – Cape Lisburne LRRS Airport – Cape Lisburne, Alaska
 PAMB (KMO) – Manokotak Airport (FAA: MBA) – Manokotak, Alaska
 PAMC (MCG) – McGrath Airport – McGrath, Alaska
 PAMD (MDO) – Middleton Island Airport – Middleton Island, Alaska
 PAMH (LMA) – Minchumina Airport – Lake Minchumina, Alaska
 PAMK (SMK) – St. Michael Airport – St. Michael, Alaska
 PAML (MLY) – Manley Hot Springs Airport – Manley Hot Springs, Alaska
 PAMM (MTM) – Metlakatla Seaplane Base – Metlakatla, Alaska
 PAMO (MOU) – Mountain Village Airport – Mountain Village, Alaska
 PAMR (MRI) – Merrill Field – Anchorage, Alaska
 PAMX (MXY) – McCarthy Airport (FAA: 15Z) – McCarthy, Alaska
 PAMY (MYU) – Mekoryuk Airport – Mekoryuk, Alaska
 PANA (WNA) – Napakiak Airport – Napakiak, Alaska
 PANC (ANC) – Ted Stevens Anchorage International Airport – Anchorage, Alaska
 PANI (ANI) – Aniak Airport – Aniak, Alaska
 PANN (ENN) – Nenana Municipal Airport – Nenana, Alaska
 PANO (NNL) – Nondalton Airport (FAA: 5NN) – Nondalton, Alaska
 PANR (FNR) – Funter Bay Seaplane Base – Funter Bay, Alaska
 PANT (ANN) – Annette Island Airport – Annette Island, Alaska
 PANU (NUL) – Nulato Airport – Nulato, Alaska
 PANV (ANV) – Anvik Airport – Anvik, Alaska
 PANW (KNW) – New Stuyahok Airport – New Stuyahok, Alaska
 PAOB (OBU) – Kobuk Airport – Kobuk, Alaska
 PAOC (PCA) – Portage Creek Airport (FAA: A14) – Portage Creek, Alaska
 PAOH (HNH) – Hoonah Airport – Hoonah, Alaska
 PAOM (OME) – Nome Airport – Nome, Alaska
 PAOO (OOK) – Toksook Bay Airport – Toksook Bay, Alaska
 PAOR (ORT) – Northway Airport – Northway, Alaska
 PAOT (OTZ) – Ralph Wien Memorial Airport – Kotzebue, Alaska
 PAOU (NLG) – Nelson Lagoon Airport (FAA: OUL) – Nelson Lagoon, Alaska
 PAPB (STG) – St. George Airport (FAA: PBV) – St. George, Alaska
 PAPC (KPC) – Port Clarence Coast Guard Station – Port Clarence, Alaska
 PAPE (KPV) – Perryville Airport (FAA: PEV) – Perryville, Alaska
 PAPG (PSG) – Petersburg James A. Johnson Airport – Petersburg, Alaska
 PAPH (PTH) – Port Heiden Airport – Port Heiden, Alaska
 PAPK (PKA) – Napaskiak Airport – Napaskiak, Alaska
 PAPM (PTU) – Platinum Airport – Platinum, Alaska
 PAPN (PIP) – Pilot Point Airport (FAA: PNP) – Pilot Point, Alaska
 PAPO (PHO) – Point Hope Airport – Point Hope, Alaska
 PAPR (PPC) – Prospect Creek Airport – Prospect Creek, Alaska
 PAQC – Klawock Seaplane Base (FAA: AQC) – Klawock, Alaska
 PAQH (KWN) – Quinhagak Airport (FAA: AQH) – Quinhagak, Alaska
 PAQT (NUI) – Nuiqsut Airport (FAA: AQT) – Nuiqsut, Alaska
 PARC (ARC) – Arctic Village Airport – Arctic Village, Alaska
 PARS (RSH) – Russian Mission Airport – Russian Mission, Alaska
 PARY (RBY) – Ruby Airport – Ruby, Alaska
 PASA (SVA) – Savoonga Airport – Savoonga, Alaska
 PASC (SCC) – Deadhorse Airport (Prudhoe Airport) – Deadhorse, Alaska
 PASD (SDP) – Sand Point Airport – Sand Point, Alaska
 PASH (SHH) – Shishmaref Airport – Shishmaref, Alaska
 PASI (SIT) – Sitka Rocky Gutierrez Airport – Sitka, Alaska
 PASK (WLK) – Selawik Airport – Selawik, Alaska
 PASL (SLQ) – Sleetmute Airport – Sleetmute, Alaska
 PASM (KSM) – St. Mary's Airport – St. Mary's, Alaska
 PASN (SNP) – St. Paul Island Airport – St. Paul Island, Alaska
 PASO (SOV) – Seldovia Airport – Seldovia, Alaska
 PASP (SMU) – Sheep Mountain Airport – Sheep Mountain, Alaska
 PAST (UMM) – Summit Airport – Summit, Alaska
 PASV (SVW) – Sparrevohn LRRS Airport – Sparrevohn, Alaska
 PASW (SKW) – Skwentna Airport – Skwentna, Alaska
 PASX (SXQ) – Soldotna Airport – Soldotna, Alaska
 PASY (SYA) – Eareckson Air Station – Shemya Island, Alaska
 PATA (TAL) – Ralph M. Calhoun Memorial Airport – Tanana, Alaska
 PATC (TNC) – Tin City LRRS Airport – Tin City, Alaska
 PATE (TLA) – Teller Airport (FAA: TER) – Teller, Alaska
 PATG (TOG) – Togiak Airport – Togiak, Alaska
 PATJ (TKJ) – Tok Airport (closed) – Tok, Alaska
 PATK (TKA) – Talkeetna Airport – Talkeetna, Alaska
 PATL (TLJ) – Tatalina LRRS Airport – Tatalina, Alaska
 PATQ (ATK) – Atqasuk Edward Burnell Sr. Memorial Airport – Atqasuk, Alaska
 PATW – Cantwell Airport (FAA: TTW) – Cantwell, Alaska
 PAUK (AUK) – Alakanuk Airport – Alakanuk, Alaska
 PAUM (UMT) – Umiat Airport – Umiat, Alaska
 PAUN (UNK) – Unalakleet Airport – Unalakleet, Alaska
 PAUO (WOW) – Willow Airport (FAA: UUO) – Willow, Alaska
 PAUT (KQA) – Akutan Airport (FAA: 7AK) – Akutan, Alaska
 PAVA (VAK) – Chevak Airport – Chevak, Alaska
 PAVC (KVC) – King Cove Airport – King Cove, Alaska
 PAVD (VDZ) – Valdez Airport (Pioneer Field) – Valdez, Alaska
 PAVE (VEE) – Venetie Airport – Venetie, Alaska
 PAVL (KVL) – Kivalina Airport – Kivalina, Alaska
 PAWB (WBQ) – Beaver Airport – Beaver, Alaska
 PAWD (SWD) – Seward Airport – Seward, Alaska
 PAWG (WRG) – Wrangell Airport – Wrangell, Alaska
 PAWI (AIN) – Wainwright Airport (FAA: AWI) – Wainwright, Alaska
 PAWM (WMO) – White Mountain Airport – White Mountain, Alaska
 PAWN (WTK) – Noatak Airport – Noatak, Alaska
 PAWR – Whittier Airport (FAA: IEM) – Whittier, Alaska
 PAWS (WWA) – Wasilla Airport (FAA: IYS) – Wasilla, Alaska
 PAWT – Wainwright Air Station (FAA: AK03) – Wainwright, Alaska
 PAXK – Paxson Airport (FAA: PXK) – Paxson, Alaska
 PAYA (YAK) – Yakutat Airport – Yakutat, Alaska

PF 
 PFAK (AKI) – Akiak Airport – Akiak, Alaska
 PFAL (AET) – Allakaket Airport (FAA: 6A8) – Allakaket, Alaska
 PFCB (NCN) – Chenega Bay Airport (FAA: C05) – Chenega, Alaska
 PFCL (CLP) – Clarks Point Airport – Clarks Point, Alaska
 PFEL (ELI) – Elim Airport – Elim, Alaska
 PFKA (KUK) – Kasigluk Airport (FAA: Z09) – Kasigluk, Alaska
 PFKK (KNK) – Kokhanok Airport (FAA: 9K2) – Kokhanok, Alaska
 PFKO (KOT) – Kotlik Airport (FAA: 2A9) – Kotlik, Alaska
 PFKT (KTS) – Brevig Mission Airport – Brevig Mission, Alaska
 PFKU (KYU) – Koyukuk Airport – Koyukuk, Alaska
 PFKW (KWT) – Kwethluk Airport – Kwethluk, Alaska
 PFMP (RMP) – Rampart Airport – Rampart, Alaska
 PFNO (ORV) – Robert (Bob) Curtis Memorial Airport (FAA: D76) – Noorvik, Alaska
 PFSH (SKK) – Shaktoolik Airport (FAA: 2C7) – Shaktoolik, Alaska
 PFTO – Tok Junction Airport (FAA: 6K8) – Tok, Alaska
 PFWS (WSN) – South Naknek Nr 2 Airport – South Naknek, Alaska
 PFYU (FYU) – Fort Yukon Airport – Fort Yukon, Alaska

PO 
 POLI – Oliktok Long Range Radar Site (closed) – Oliktok Point, Alaska

PP 
 PPDM (DIO) – Diomede Heliport – Diomede, Alaska
 PPIT (NUP) – Nunapitchuk Airport – Nunapitchuk, Alaska
 PPIZ (PIZ) – Point Lay LRRS Airport – Point Lay, Alaska

PC – Kiribati (central – Phoenix Islands) 

 PCIS (CIS) – Canton Island Airport – Canton Island

PG – Mariana Islands

Guam 

 PGUA (UAM) – Andersen Air Force Base – Agana
 PGUM (GUM) – Antonio B. Won Pat International Airport (Guam International) – Agana

Northern Mariana Islands 

 PGRO (ROP) – Rota International Airport (Benjamin Taisacan Manglona International Airport) (FAA: GRO) – Rota Island
 PGSN (SPN) – Saipan International Airport (Francisco C. Ada International Airport) (FAA: GSN) – Saipan Island
 PGWT (TIQ) – Tinian International Airport (West Tinian) (FAA: TNI) – Tinian Island

PH – Hawaii 

 PHBK (BKH) – Pacific Missile Range Facility (Barking Sands) – Kauai County, Hawaii
 PHDH (HDH) – Dillingham Airfield – Mokuleia, Hawaii
 PHHF – French Frigate Shoals Airport – Tern Island, French Frigate Shoals
 PHHI (HHI) – Wheeler Army Airfield – Wahiawa, Hawaii
 PHHN (HNM) – Hana Airport – Hana, Hawaii
 PHIK (HIK) – Hickam AFB – Honolulu, Hawaii
 PHJH (JHM) – Kapalua Airport (Kapalua West Mau'i Airport) – Lahaina, Hawaii
 PHJR – Kalaeloa Airport (John Rodgers Field) – Kapolei, Hawaii
 PHKO (KOA) – Ellison Onizuka Kona International Airport at Keahole – Kailua-Kona, Hawaii
 PHLI (LIH) – Lihu'e Airport – Lihue, Hawaii
 PHLU (LUP) – Kalaupapa Airport – Kalaupapa, Hawaii
 PHMK (MKK) – Molokai Airport (Hoolehua Airport) – Kaunakakai, Hawaii
 PHMU (MUE) – Waimea-Kohala Airport – Kamuela, Hawaii
 PHNG – Marine Corps Air Station Kaneohe Bay – Kaneohe, Hawaii, Honolulu, Hawaii
 PHNL (HNL) – Honolulu International Airport (Daniel K. Inouye International Airport) – Honolulu, Hawaii
 PHNP – Naval Auxiliary Landing Field Ford Island – Honolulu, Hawaii
 PHNY (LNY) – Lanai Airport – Lanai City, Hawaii
 PHOG (OGG) – Kahului Airport – Kahului, Hawaii
 PHPA (PAK) – Port Allen Airport – Hanapepe, Hawaii
 PHSF (BSF) – Bradshaw Army Airfield – Hawaii (island), Hawaii
 PHTO (ITO) – Hilo International Airport – Hilo, Hawaii
 PHUP (UPP) – ʻUpolu Airport – Hawi, Hawaii

PJ – Johnston Atoll 

 PJON (JON) – Johnston Atoll Airport (defunct) – Johnston Atoll

PK – Marshall Islands 

 PKMA (ENT) – Enewetak Auxiliary Airfield – Enewetak
 PKMJ (MAJ) – Marshall Islands International Airport (Amata Kabua Int'l) – Majuro
 PKRO – Freeflight International Airport (Dyess Army Airfield) – Roi-Namur
 PKWA (KWA) – Bucholz Army Airfield – Kwajalein

PL – Line Islands (Kiribati (eastern) and U.S. territories) 

 PLCH (CXI) – Cassidy International Airport – Kiritimati, Kiribati (Christmas Island)
 PLPA – Palmyra (Cooper) Airport – Palmyra Atoll (U.S. territory)

PM – Midway Atoll 

 PMDY (MDY) – Henderson Field (Naval Air Facility) – Sand Island

PT – Caroline Islands (Federated States of Micronesia and Palau)

Federated States of Micronesia 

 PTKK (TKK) – Chuuk International Airport – Weno, Chuuk
 PTPN (PNI) – Pohnpei International Airport – Pohnpei
 PTSA (KSA) – Kosrae International Airport (FAA: TTK) – Kosrae
 PTYA (YAP) – Yap International Airport (FAA: T11) – Yap

Palau 

 PTRO (ROR) – Palau International Airport  (Roman Tmetuchl International Airport) – Airai, Palau

PW – Wake Island 

 PWAK (AWK) – Wake Island Airfield – Wake Island

References

 *  – includes IATA codes
 FAA Order JO 7350.8H - Location Identifiers. Federal Aviation Administration. Effective August 27, 2009.
 Alaska ICAO Identifiers; Decode
 Alaska ICAO Identifiers; Encode
 Pacific ICAO Identifiers
 Hawaii ICAO Identifiers

P
Airports
Lists of buildings and structures in Kiribati
Guam-related lists
Northern Mariana Islands-related lists
Hawaii transportation-related lists
Marshall Islands transportation-related lists
Lists of buildings and structures in the Federated States of Micronesia
Airports, P
Airports, P